Jasikan College of Education is a teacher education college in Jasikan-Buem (Jasikan District, Oti Region, Ghana). The college is located in Volta Zone zone. It is one of the about 40 public colleges of education in Ghana. The college participated in the DFID-funded T-TEL programme.

History 
Jasikan College of Education was first established at Peki Blengo as a Body Cooperate college (BODYCO) on 21 January 1952 with the motto "Sapere Aude" which means "Dare to be Wise". Thirty male students were enrolled at its inception. The pioneer staff included Rev. Eugene Garu, a German-American missionary, Ag. Principal, Messrs H.B.K. Ogbete and P.K. Kpeto.

The college moved to Jasikan in December 1952. Nana Osei Brantuo III released land for its development. The college started with a 2-year Teacher's Certificate ‘B’ Post Middle programme in 1952. The programme was upgraded to 4-year Teacher's Certificate ‘A’ Post Middle/2-year Post ‘B’. The 2-year Teacher's Certificate ‘A’ Post Secondary was introduced into the college in 1974. In 1975, it admitted the first batch of 3-year Post Secondary students. Between 1985 and 1991, the college run the Modular programme. The Diploma in Basic Education programme was introduced in October 2004 for regular students; in 2005 for untrained teachers and in 2006 for Certificate ‘A’ teachers on sandwich basis.

References 

Colleges of Education in Ghana
Oti Region
Educational institutions established in 1952
1952 establishments in Gold Coast (British colony)